The 2022 Frontier League season was the 29th season of professional baseball in the Frontier League, an independent baseball league in the United States and Canada, since its creation in June 1993. There are 16 Frontier League teams, split evenly between East and West divisions.

The Schaumburg Boomers entered the season as the defending champions, having defeated the Washington Wild Things, three games to two, in the league's 2021 championship series. In 2022, however, they were defeated in four games by the Québec Capitales.

Season schedule
The 16 teams in the league are split evenly between two divisions, East and West.

Due to the folding of the Southern Illinois Miners following the 2021 season, the league introduced a new team, the Empire State Greys, to compete as a traveling team with a roster of players from the Empire Professional Baseball League.

The season was played with a 96-game schedule; teams play either three or four series against their division rivals while facing the eight teams from the other division at least once each. The top three teams in each division will qualify for the 2022 playoffs, with the first-place team already qualifying for the division championship, and the second and third place teams playing each other in a wild card game.

Regular season standings

 y – Clinched division
 x – Clinched playoff spot
 e – Eliminated from playoff contention

Statistical leaders

Hitting

Pitching

Awards

End of year awards

Playoffs

Format 
The second-place team will host the third-place team from their division in a wild card game.  The winner of these games will face their division winners in a best-of-three divisional series, with the division winners hosting games 2 and 3 (if necessary). The championship playoffs shall be scheduled to begin on the second day following the scheduled completion of the division playoffs. The championship series will be a best-of-five format.  The team advancing with the best regular-season record will host games 3, 4, and 5 (if necessary).  In the event of a tie, tie-breaking procedures as outlined in league rules will be utilized.

Playoff bracket

See also
2022 Major League Baseball season
2022 American Association season
2022 Pecos League season

References

Frontier League season
Frontier League